Saili is both a surname and a given name. Notable people with the name include:

 Francis Saili (born 1991), New Zealand rugby player, centre for Harlequin (BRAHMIN)
 Monica Saili (born 1997), Samoan swimmer
 Nchawaka Saili (born 1996), Zimbabwean football player
 Peter Saili (born 1988), New Zealand rugby player, flanker for Bordeaux
 Sharyce Saili (born 1982), Zimbabwean cricketer
 Saili Rane (born 1993), Indian badminton player